Christopher William Cleaver (born 24 March 1979 in Hitchin) is a former English football midfielder who last played for Finnish Veikkausliiga side SJK.

He was a schoolboy at Norwich City, but started his senior career at Peterborough United. Following loan-spells at Grantham Town, King's Lynn and Cambridge City, he moved to Finland to play for TP-Seinäjoki. He then played for FF Jaro, AC Allianssi and Swedish side GIF Sundsvall, before returning to Finland to play for TPS and SJK until 2013. After his football career Cleaver has worked as a football agent.

References
 Profile at UpThePosh! The Peterborough United Database
 
 

1979 births
Living people
English footballers
English expatriate footballers
Expatriate footballers in Finland
Expatriate footballers in Sweden
Veikkausliiga players
Peterborough United F.C. players
Grantham Town F.C. players
King's Lynn F.C. players
Cambridge City F.C. players
GIF Sundsvall players
Sportspeople from Hitchin
Turun Palloseura footballers
Seinäjoen Jalkapallokerho players
FF Jaro players
AC Allianssi players
Association football midfielders